Gartland & Werley classification is a system of categorizing Colles' fractures. In the Gartland & Werley classification system there are three types of fractures. The classification system is based on metaphysical comminution, intra-articular extension and displacement, and was first published in 1951.

Classification
 Type 1: Extra-articular, displaced
 Type 2: Intra-articular, no displacement
 Type 3: Intra-articular, displaced

See also
 Frykman classification
 Lidström classification
 Nissen-Lie classification
 Older's classification

References

Orthopedic classifications